NIM811 is a mitochondrial permeability transition inhibitor. Also known as N-methyl-4-isoleucine cyclosporin, it is a four-substituted cyclosporine analogue that binds to cyclophilin, however this binary complex cannot bind to calcineurin, and therefore lacks immunosuppressive activity.

NIM811 is a form of treatment for patients with the  hepatitis C virus (HCV).  Studies indicate a strong relationship between a treatments cyclophilin binding affinity and suppression of HCV activity.  NIM811 is also being studied as a potential treatment to genetic muscular diseases such as Ullrich congenital muscular dystrophy (UCMD) and  Bethlem myopathy (BM) disease, diseases altering the genes for collagen VI production.

References

Cyclic peptides
Macrocycles